Kahunge is a town council in Kamwenge District of the Western Region of Uganda.

Location 
Kahunge Town Council is found in Kibale County, Kamwenge District in the Western Region of Uganda.

Overview 
The town was promoted to town council status by the District Council of Kamwenge District in 2017 and it became functional in 2018.
Kahunge is a busy trading centre and there is a motor stage for the vehicles plying Kamwenge-Fort Portal highway. People in rural Kahunge grow pineapples, maize, beans and coffee as a major cash crop. There is also dairy farming at a small scale.

Points of interest 
The following additional points of interest lie within the town or near its boundaries.
Nyakahita-Kazo-Kamwenge-Fort Portal Road-a  road passes through the town.
Kyabenda Senior Secondary School – one of the oldest secondary schools in Kamwenge District is found within the town.
St. Michael secondary school - a Catholic founded school.
Kahunge Community Health Unit, an Anglican Church founded health facility.

See also 
Kamwenge
Kamwenge District
Nyakahita-Kazo-Kamwenge-Fort Portal Road
Kibale County

References 

Populated places in Western Region, Uganda